Falkman is a surname. Notable people with the surname include:

Charlotta Falkman (1795–1882), Swedish-Finnish novelist
Craig Falkman (born 1943), American ice hockey player
Loa Falkman (born 1947), Swedish opera singer and actor
Olena Falkman (1849–1928), Swedish concert vocalist